is a 1997 scrolling shooter arcade video game developed by Success and published by Tecmo. The fourth installment in the Cotton franchise, it is the arcade sequel to Cotton: Fantastic Night Dreams. In the game, players assume the role of either the titular young witch or her rival Appli who, alongside their companions Silk and Needle, sets out on a quest to defeat several monsters and retrieve the missing "Bluewater Willow" candy to Pumpkin Kingdom. Its gameplay is similar to the first game, consisting of shooting mixed with fighting and role-playing game-esque elements using a main three-button configuration. It ran on the ST-V hardware.

Headed by Takato Yoshinari, Cotton 2 was developed by members at Success who previously worked on the original Cotton. The game was later ported to Sega Saturn. In 1998, a remixed arcade edition titled Cotton Boomerang: Magical Night Dreams was released by Tecmo with additional characters, new gameplay and scoring systems, as well as altered stages and visuals. Both Cotton 2 and Cotton Boomerang were met with positive reception from critics since their release on Saturn, most of which reviewed them as import titles, for being faithful conversions of the arcade originals.

Gameplay 

Cotton 2: Magical Night Dreams is a scrolling shooter game similar to Cotton: Fantastic Night Dreams where players assume the role of young witch Cotton or her rival Appil who alongside their companions, the fairy Silk and the hat Needle, travel across seven increasingly difficult stages through a magical dream-like world on a quest to defeat several monsters and retrieve the missing "Bluewater Willow" candy to Pumpkin Kingdom.

Like its predecessor, the players must blast various monsters and avoid being shot while collecting elemental crystal power-ups to enhance Cotton and Appli's firepower respectively in a similar manner as Soldier Blade to unleash powerful magic spells on enemies. The color of these crystals can be changed by shooting at them and they also determines the element of Cotton and Appli's primary shot but deploying these crystals for a magic spell decreases the firepower of each character. The game incorporates some role-playing game elements as with the original Cotton, as players are able to level up their attack up to 5 levels, but excluded gameplay mechanics in the sequel are the charge attacks and fairy abilities.

New to Cotton 2 are the introduction of a lifebar for each character to sustain multiple enemy hits and fighting game elements, as players can perform "command" shots by executing a combination of directional and button-based commands to fire in multiple directions, as well as pick up enemies and their shots to throw them around to destroy other enemies by performing one of the "command" shots to seal them into an orb and pick trapped enemies to use them as shield. The orb behaves differently based on the currently equipped elemental magic, while keeping it on-screen and scoring chain combos is crucial to reach high-scores, as it grant points by turning into a bubble depending on the number of defeated enemies after falling off-screen or hitting a strong enemy. Players can also shoot the orb to reveal health items.

Development and release 
Cotton 2: Magical Night Dreams was created by members at Success who previously worked on Cotton: Fantastic Night Dreams, with Takato Yoshinari heading its development as producer. Both Masahiro Fukuda and Masaru Hatsuyama returned as chief designer and programmers respectively. Artists Hiroyuki Hasegawa, Hitoshi Nishimura, Liu Xiangdong and Toshihisa Katsuki were responsible for character and monster designs, as well as backgrounds. The music was composed by Kenichi Hirata. Other companies such as Ken Production and Ishigaki Production also collaborated as production supporters.

Cotton 2: Magical Night Dreams was first released in Japanese arcades in November 1997 by Tecmo, running on the ST-V board. On December 4, 1997, Cotton 2 received an arcade-perfect conversion for the Sega Saturn published by Success in Japan, featuring an exclusive "Saturn" mode and new control options. Prior to launch, the Saturn version of Cotton 2 was unveiled at the September 1997 Tokyo Game Show just days after the game was released in arcades. On September 19, 1997, a soundtrack album containing music from Cotton 2: Magical Night Dreams was co-published in Japan by Scitron and Pony Canyon. On October 28, 1998, a Cotton 2-themed desktop accessories collection titled Cotton 2 Tenkomori was published by Success for Windows 95 and Windows 98 computers.

A remixed arcade edition dubbed Cotton Boomerang: Magical Night Dreams was released in Japanese arcades by Tecmo in September 1998, running on the ST-V board as Cotton 2 featuring additional characters, new gameplay and scoring systems, as well as altered stage layouts and visuals. On October 8, 1998, Cotton Boomerang received a version for the Saturn published by Success in Japan, featuring an art gallery and new control options as the Cotton 2 port on Saturn.

In September 2021, the Saturn versions of Cotton 2 and Cotton Boomerang were included alongside Guardian Force (1998) as part of the Cotton Guardian Force Saturn Tribute compilation for Nintendo Switch, PC and PlayStation 4 with added features such as online rankings. ININ Games and Strictly Limited Games later announced that the compilation would be launched in western regions under two editions, while  Cotton 2 was published worldwide by City Connection as a separate digital release from the compilation for PS4 and Switch on September 30, 2021, marking the game's first international appearance. City Connection announced an incoming patch that addresses frame lag issues in the collection. In 2022, City Connection revealed that the compilation will be ported to PC.

Reception 

Cotton 2: Magical Night Dreams, as well as Cotton Boomerang: Magical Night Dreams, were met with positive reception from critics since their release on Sega Saturn. According to Famitsu, the Saturn conversion of Cotton 2 sold over 8,907 copies in its first week on the market. Readers of the Japanese Sega Saturn Magazine voted to give the Saturn versions of both Cotton 2 and Cotton Boomerang scores of a 8.6363 and 8.2857 out of 10, ranking at the number 180 and 301 spots respectively, indicating a large popular following.

During its showing at the 1997 Tokyo Game Show, the European Sega Saturn Magazine regarded the Saturn version of Cotton 2: Magical Night Dreams as a "High quality arcade conversion of a very polished two-player action shoot 'em up." Ação Gamess Ronny Marinoto reviewed the Saturn version of Cotton 2 and praised the coloful visuals, fast gameplay and audio, while regaridng its challenge as interesting and fun. German magazine Fun Generation regarded the Saturn port of the game as playable and commended its co-op mode, stating that it adds "additional appeal to present the game as a party gag."

Super Game Powers Marcelo Kamikaze and Marjorie Bros also reviewed the Saturn ports of both Cotton 2 and Cotton Boomerang respectively and gave positive remarks to its audiovisal presentation, controls, fun factor and originality. Video Gamess Wolfgang Schaedle reviewed the Saturn release of Cotton Boomerang as well, highlighting the precise controls and 2D graphics, stating that "Action fans who like an uncomplicated shooting game principle are well served with Cotton Boomerang."

Notes

References

External links 

 Cotton 2: Magical Night Dreams at Killer List of Videogames
 Cotton Boomerang: Magical Night Dreams at Killer List of Videogames

1997 video games
Arcade video games
Cooperative video games
Multiplayer and single-player video games
Nintendo Switch games
PlayStation 4 games
Sega Saturn games
Windows games
Scrolling shooters
Success (company) games
Video games about witchcraft
Video games developed in Japan
Video games featuring female protagonists
Cotton (series)